Nilphamari Government High School is a government high school in Nilphamari Sadar, Nilphamari, Bangladesh. It was established in 1882 by the British.

References

External links 
 

Dinajpur Education Board
Schools in Nilphamari District
High schools in Bangladesh
Educational institutions established in 1882
1882 establishments in India